WGTI (97.7 FM) is an Air 1-affiliated radio station broadcasting a Worship Music format. Licensed to Winfall, North Carolina, United States, it serves the Elizabeth City-Nags Head area as well as the Hampton Roads area.  The station is currently owned by the Educational Media Foundation.

External links

GTI
Air1 radio stations
Radio stations established in 1981
1981 establishments in North Carolina
Educational Media Foundation radio stations